Colegio San Antonio del Baluarte is a Chilean elementary school located in Rengo, Cachapoal Province, Chile. It was founded in 1981.

References 

Educational institutions established in 1981
Secondary schools in Chile
Schools in Cachapoal Province
1981 establishments in Chile